Rómulo Bouzas Rodríguez (born 28 February 1978) is a Mexican former rower. He competed in the men's lightweight double sculls event at the 2000 Summer Olympics.

Notes

References

External links
 

1978 births
Living people
Mexican male rowers
Olympic rowers of Mexico
Rowers at the 2000 Summer Olympics
Rowers from Mexico City
Pan American Games medalists in rowing
Pan American Games silver medalists for Mexico
Rowers at the 1999 Pan American Games
Medalists at the 1999 Pan American Games
20th-century Mexican people
21st-century Mexican people